Ulu Cheka is a small village in Jerantut District, Pahang, Malaysia.

References

Jerantut District
Villages in Pahang